Chandrakona Road is an inhabited place in the Garhbeta III CD block in the Medinipur Sadar subdivision of the Paschim Medinipur district, West Bengal, India.

Geography

Location

Area overview
The Paschim Medinipur district, before separation from Jhargram, had a total forest area of 1,700 km2, accounting for 14.31% of the total forested area of the state. It is obvious from the map of the Midnapore Sadar subdivision, placed alongside, is that there are large stretches of forests in the subdivision. The soil is predominantly lateritic. Around 30% of the population of the district resides in this subdivision. 13.95% of the population lives in urban areas and 86.05% lives in the rural areas.

Note: The map alongside presents some of the notable locations in the subdivision. All places marked in the map are linked in the larger full screen map.

Civic administration
Garbeta police station has an outpost at Chandrakona Road.

Transport
The town is situated at the intersection of the National Highway 14, running from Morgram to Kharagpur (Old National Highway 60) and the National Highway 116B, running from Nandakumar to Chandaneswar.

Chandrakona Road railway station is situated on Kharagpur–Bankura–Adra line of South Eastern railway zone.

Education
Gourav Guin Memorial College was established at Chandrakona Road, PO Satbankura in 2008. Affiliated with Vidyasagar University, it offers honours courses in Bengal, English and history and a general course in arts.

References

Cities and towns in Paschim Medinipur district